Chagall is a 1963 short documentary film directed by Lauro Venturi which focuses on the work of artist Marc Chagall. It won an Oscar at the 36th Academy Awards in 1964 for Documentary Short Subject. The Academy Film Archive preserved Chagall in 2008.

Cast
 Vincent Price as narrator (voice)
 Marc Chagall as himself

References

External links

1963 films
1963 documentary films
1963 short films
1963 independent films
1960s French-language films
1960s English-language films
1960s short documentary films
American short documentary films
Best Documentary Short Subject Academy Award winners
American independent films
Marc Chagall
Documentary films about visual artists
1960s multilingual films
1960s American films